Tatjana Vasilevich (born January 14, 1977) is a Ukrainian chess player, and an international master.

She has won the Women's Ukrainian Chess Championship three times, and competed in the Women's World Chess Championship twice, and played for the Ukrainian women's team which won a bronze in the World Team Chess Championship.

External links
her games

Ukrainian female chess players
Living people
1977 births
Chess International Masters
People from Yevpatoria